In the mathematical field of graph theory, a complete graph is a simple undirected graph in which every pair of distinct vertices is connected by a unique edge.  A complete digraph is a directed graph in which every pair of distinct vertices is connected by a pair of unique edges (one in each direction).

Graph theory itself is typically dated as beginning with Leonhard Euler's 1736 work on the Seven Bridges of Königsberg. However, drawings of complete graphs, with their vertices placed on the points of a regular polygon, had already appeared in the 13th century, in the work of Ramon Llull. Such a drawing is sometimes referred to as a mystic rose.

Properties
Some sources claim that the letter  in this notation stands for the German word , but the German name for a complete graph, does not contain the letter , and other sources state that the notation honors the contributions of Kazimierz Kuratowski to graph theory.

 has  edges (a triangular number), and is a regular graph of degree .  All complete graphs are their own maximal cliques. They are maximally connected as the only vertex cut which disconnects the graph is the complete set of vertices. The complement graph of a complete graph is an empty graph.

If the edges of a complete graph are each given an orientation, the resulting directed graph is called a tournament.

 can be decomposed into  trees  such that  has  vertices. Ringel's conjecture asks if the complete graph  can be decomposed into copies of any tree with  edges. This is known to be true for sufficiently large .

where  refers to Euler's constant, and

The number of matchings of the complete graphs are given by the telephone numbers
 1, 1, 2, 4, 10, 26, 76, 232, 764, 2620, 9496, 35696, 140152, 568504, 2390480, 10349536, 46206736, ... .

These numbers give the largest possible value of the Hosoya index for an -vertex graph. The number of perfect matchings of the complete graph  (with  even) is given by the double factorial .

Further values are collected by the Rectilinear Crossing Number project.
0, 0, 0, 0, 1, 3, 9, 19, 36, 62, 102, 153, 229, 324, 447, 603, 798, 1029, 1318, 1657, 2055, 2528, 3077, 3699, 4430, 5250, 6180, ... .

Geometry and topology

A complete graph with  nodes represents the edges of an -simplex.  Geometrically  forms the edge set of a triangle,  a tetrahedron, etc.  The Császár polyhedron, a nonconvex polyhedron with the topology of a torus, has the complete graph  as its skeleton.  Every neighborly polytope in four or more dimensions also has a complete skeleton.

 through  are all planar graphs.  However, every planar drawing of a complete graph with five or more vertices must contain a crossing, and the nonplanar complete graph  plays a key role in the characterizations of planar graphs: by Kuratowski's theorem, a graph is planar if and only if it contains neither  nor the complete bipartite graph  as a subdivision, and by Wagner's theorem the same result holds for graph minors in place of subdivisions.  As part of the Petersen family,  plays a similar role as one of the forbidden minors for linkless embedding. In other words, and as Conway and Gordon proved, every embedding of  into three-dimensional space is intrinsically linked, with at least one pair of linked triangles.  Conway and Gordon also showed that any three-dimensional embedding of  contains a Hamiltonian cycle that is embedded in space as a nontrivial knot.

Examples

See also
 Fully connected network, in computer networking
 Complete bipartite graph (or biclique), a special bipartite graph where every vertex on one side of the bipartition is connected to every vertex on the other side

References

External links

 

Parametric families of graphs
Regular graphs